United States v. Comstock, 560 U.S. 126 (2010), was a decision by the Supreme Court of the United States, which held that the federal government has authority under the Necessary and Proper Clause to require the civil commitment of individuals already in Federal custody. The practice, introduced by the Adam Walsh Child Protection and Safety Act, was upheld against a challenge that it fell outside the enumerated powers granted to Congress by the Constitution. The decision did not rule on any other aspect of the law's constitutionality, because only the particular issue of Congressional authority was properly before the Court.

Background 
Six days before Graydon Earl Comstock was to have completed a 37-month sentence for receiving child pornography, Attorney General Alberto R. Gonzales certified that Comstock was a sexually dangerous person. The law that Attorney General Gonzales was applying was ruled unconstitutional by lower courts on the grounds it exceeded Congress’s constitutional authority.
Argued in January 2010 by Solicitor General Elena Kagan, the position of the United States was that the Necessary and Proper Clause gave Congress the power to enact the law.

Decision 
Stephen Breyer delivered the opinion of the Court, which decided that the "Necessary and Proper" Clause permitted Congress to enact such a provision. John Roberts, John Paul Stevens, Ruth Bader Ginsburg, and Sonia Sotomayor joined Breyer's opinion. Anthony Kennedy and Samuel Alito filed opinions concurring in the judgment. Clarence Thomas filed a dissenting opinion in which Antonin Scalia joined in all but Part III– A–1–b.

Five considerations 
The Court said: "We base this conclusion on five considerations, taken together." The five considerations are as follows.  
The Necessary and Proper Clause grants Congress broad power to enact laws that are "rationally related" and "reasonably adapted" to executing the other enumerated powers.  
The statute at issue "constitutes a modest addition" to related statutes that have existed for many decades.  
The statute in question reasonably extends longstanding policy. 
The statute properly accounts for state interests, by ending the federal government's role "with respect to an individual covered by the statute" whenever a state requests.  
The statute is narrowly tailored to only address the legitimate federal interest.

See also 
 United States federal laws governing defendants with mental diseases or defects
 Kansas v. Hendricks (1997) 
 Kansas v. Crane (2002)
 List of United States Supreme Court cases, volume 560

References

External links

 

United States Supreme Court cases
United States Supreme Court cases of the Roberts Court
2010 in United States case law
Mental health law in the United States
Sex laws